Belfast South can refer to:

The southern part of Belfast
Belfast South (Assembly constituency)
Belfast South (Northern Ireland Parliament constituency)
Belfast South (UK Parliament constituency)